The  is a skyscraper  in Shibuya, Tokyo, Japan. It was completed in 2001, and was built using empty lots formerly occupied by the headquarters of Tokyu Corporation. It is 184 metres tall and has 41 floors as well as 6 underground floors. The building covers a total ground area of 106,000 m². It was the tallest building in the Shibuya station area until the opening of Shibuya Scramble Square in 2019.

The two main materials used in the building's construction were glass and steel.

The Tower has both office space and a hotel, the Cerulean Tower Tokyu Hotel.

Floor directory

See also

References

External links
Cerulean Tower

Buildings and structures in Shibuya
Skyscraper office buildings in Tokyo
Skyscraper hotels in Tokyo
2001 establishments in Japan
Office buildings completed in 2001
Hotel buildings completed in 2001